MAT Holdings, Inc. is an American company that manufactures air compressors, pneumatic tools, generators, pressure washers, and accessories.  Gabriel Shock & Struts; Midwest Air Technologies (Fencing, Pet Containment, Lawn & Garden accessories, and other consumer goods; MAT Logistics, distribution and 3PL; and Heavy Duty Brake relining divisions.  

The main company was founded in 1984. In 1999 Devilbiss Air Power Co. was acquired by Pentair. Pentair sold the company to Black & Decker in 2004.  Following the 2010 merger of Stanley Works and Black and Decker, the new Stanley Black & Decker sold DeVilbiss Air Power to MAT Holdings on March 31, 2011.

References

External links 
 

Pneumatic tool manufacturers
Companies based in Illinois
1999 mergers and acquisitions
2011 mergers and acquisitions
Tool manufacturing companies of the United States